Challans is a commune in the Vendée department in the Pays de la Loire region in western France. Challans station has rail connections to Saint-Gilles-Croix-de-Vie and Nantes.

Population

Notable people 

 Pauline de Lézardière, born Challans, 25 March 1754, died Proustière Castle, Poiroux, 8 February 1835. Historian

Twin towns — sister cities
Challans is twinned with:
  Saronno, Italy (2004)

See also
 Communes of the Vendée department

References

Communes of Vendée
Poitou
Vendée communes articles needing translation from French Wikipedia